Edwin Santibáñez  (born 1 February 1980) is a Mexican retired footballer. He played for Club León of the Liga de Ascenso. In the Mexican draft of July 5, he decided to end his career as a player.

Santibáñez played for Mexico at the 1997 FIFA U-17 World Championship in Egypt.

References

External links

Stats at ESPN

1976 births
Living people
Sportspeople from Torreón
Footballers from Coahuila
Mexican footballers
Association football midfielders
Club América footballers
C.F. Pachuca players
San Luis F.C. players
Indios de Ciudad Juárez footballers
Club León footballers
Liga MX players